Horacio Alejandro Macedo Esquivel (born April 15, 1963) is a Mexican football manager and former player. He was born in Mexico City.

References

External links

1963 births
Living people
Mexican footballers
Association football defenders
Club Universidad Nacional footballers
Correcaminos UAT footballers
Tecos F.C. footballers
Querétaro F.C. footballers
Footballers from Mexico City